Dioryctria auranticella, the ponderosa pineconeworm moth, is a moth of the family Pyralidae. The species was first described by Augustus Radcliffe Grote in 1883. It is found in western North America from southern British Columbia south to California and Arizona, east to South Dakota and New Mexico.

Its wingspan is 10.5–14 mm. The forewings are orange and the hindwings are white. Adults are on wing from mid-July to early August.

The larvae feed on Pinus ponderosa and Pinus attenuata. They generally feed in the cones of their host plant, but occasionally feed on the twigs.

Gallery

References

Moths described in 1883
auranticella